Louie R. Guenthner Jr. (August 9, 1944 – August 7, 2012), was an attorney from Louisville, Kentucky, who was a Republican former member of the Kentucky House of Representatives, having represented the 48th District in Jefferson County from 1973 to 1988. The district included the affluent areas of Indian Hills and Prospect. He was defeated in the 1988 primary election for re-nomination to the state House by his fellow Republican, Susan Bush Stokes. He had two children, Melissa Guenthner (now Atkins) and Louis Robert Guenthner, III. He was married to Betty Guenthner, who died in 2007.

Guenthner was the Republican nominee in the 1978 United States Senate election in Kentucky; he lost to the incumbent Democrat Walter Huddleston. Six years later, Mitch McConnell, also of Jefferson County, upset Huddleston, who then became a Washington, D.C.,-based lobbyist. Guenthner also made an unsuccessful run for Jefferson County judge-executive in 1985.

References

1944 births
2012 deaths
Republican Party members of the Kentucky House of Representatives
Kentucky lawyers
Politicians from Louisville, Kentucky
Candidates in the 1978 United States elections
20th-century American politicians
20th-century American lawyers